S. F. Vilas Home for Aged & Infirmed Ladies is a historic multiple dwelling located at Plattsburgh in Clinton County, New York.  It was built in 1889-1890 and is a three-story, brick, monumental multiple dwelling structure in the Queen Anne style.  It features truncated hipped roofs with cross-gable wings, corbelled decorative chimneys, and bands of colored brickwork.  It was built as a 44-bed residence for aged and infirmed women.

It was listed on the National Register of Historic Places in 1982.

References

Residential buildings on the National Register of Historic Places in New York (state)
Queen Anne architecture in New York (state)
Residential buildings completed in 1890
Buildings and structures in Clinton County, New York
National Register of Historic Places in Clinton County, New York